This is an incomplete list of Macedonian television series.

B
Beloto ciganche (1983)
Bulki kraj Shinite (1981)	
Busava azbuka	(1985)

D
Dajte muzika	(1993)
Dzish
Dnevna Soba

E
Eden na Eden (2008) Talk show
Ednooki	(2006)

G
Golemiot Brat (2009) Reality 
Golemi i mali	(2000)

J
Jadi Burek Talk

K
K-15 (1994) Comedy
Koj saka da bode Milioner? (2004) Quiz 
Ku Manijia Comedy
KOD so Snezana Lupevska Talk

M
Makedonski Narodni Prikazni
Makedonski Narodni Prikazni 2 (1992)
Makedonski Narodni Prikazni 3 (2010)
Macedonian Idol	(2010) Talent
Milenko Nedelkovski Show Talk

O
Od denes za utre	(2010)

P
Prespav   (2016)

S
Sharam Baram (1985)
Salon harmoni (1998)

T
Tanc so Zvezdite	(2013) Talent
Toa sum Jas Reality
Trst via Skopje	(1987)
Tvrdokorni	(1988)

V
Vo Centar
Vo svetot na bajkite 	(1995)
Volsebnoto samarche	(1972)
Vtora smena 	(1988)

X
X Factor Adria (2013) Talent, Reality